The 1973 Londonderry City Council election took place on 30 May 1973 to elect members of Londonderry City Council in Northern Ireland. This was on the same day as other Northern Irish local elections.  The campaign was significant in that, following changes to the election process and districts, Irish nationalist parties were able to take control of the council for the first time.

Background 
The election was the first held since the Londonderry Corporation had been reorganised under the Local Government (Boundaries) Act (Northern Ireland) 1971 following accusations of gerrymandering from the Corporation. The vote was also the first to use the single transferable vote method of election for Londonderry council elections.

During the elections, the Ulster Unionist Party (UUP), Democratic Unionist Party (DUP), and Vanguard Unionist Progressive Party joined forces as The United Loyalist Group for the Londonderry City Council elections.  The group also claimed the backing of the Loyalist Association of Workers, the Ulster Protestant Volunteers, and the Ulster Special Constabulary Association.  It was jointly chaired by Gerard Glover, chair of the City of Londonderry and Foyle Unionist Association, and Gordon Hegarty, a parliamentary agent for the DUP.  It was initially unclear whether the coalition had the backing of the UUP headquarters, but Jim Bailie, the party secretary, stated that "I am sure whatever they are doing is all right by me".  The group had a four point programme: total defeat of the Irish Republican Army, control of the police to be given to the Northern Ireland Assembly, increased representation of Northern Ireland in the Westminster Parliament, and opposition to a Council of Ireland.  The group took over the local headquarters of the UUP, on Kennedy Place.

The nationalist Social Democratic and Labour Party (SDLP) contested Londonderry City Council elections for the first time since being established in 1970 in protest against abstentionism policies from the Nationalist Party.  It stood 19 candidates, the most of any party in the election.

The Alliance Party of Northern Ireland stood 15 candidates, while the Derry Republican Club, backed by the Official Irish Republican Army (OIRA) stood 12, as did the United Loyalists.  The Nationalist Party stood 10, including Fergus McAteer, son of the party leader, while there was a single Northern Ireland Labour Party candidate.  Independent candidates included Brendan Duddy, a local fish-and-chip shop owner, and Finbar O'Doherty, a law student.

Campaign
During the campaign, the British Army reduced its foot patrols in the city, arguing that this would help create an atmosphere in which people would feel confident to go and vote.  The Provisional Irish Republican Army (PIRA) did not conduct any bombings in the week leading up to the vote, an unusually long lull for the period.  The group also went door-to-door, calling for a boycott of the election.

The day before the election, the PIRA and OIRA announced a surprising joint initiative of protest marches, strikes and the creation of "no-go areas" for police, in protest at internment, but coming at such a late point in the campaign, the Irish Times contended that it would have little effect on the vote.

The Republican Clubs published a half-page advert in the Derry Journal, claiming that both the SDLP and the Nationalist Party had broken pledges not to contest local elections until all internees had been released.  John Hume, deputy leader of the SDLP, claimed that the party's pledge was specific to the period when the Parliament of Northern Ireland had existed.  The Alliance Party accused Hume of having only visited Shantallow twice since he was elected to represent it in 1969, but Hume argued that he had visited it on numerous occasions, and had three volunteers running an advice centre in the district.  Hume claimed that the Alliance Party's candidates were unionists and were "yesterday's men".

The Nationalist Party argued that the SDLP was standing too many candidates, risking splitting the nationalist vote and thereby allowing the unionists to win more seats.  It campaigned for the council to work closely with tenants' and other community groups, and for the council to move away from party politics.

Hume claimed that the SDLP would do "very well", but would not be drawn on whether it would achieve a majority on the council, while Hegarty of the United Loyalists thought that it would win 10 seats.  The Alliance Party focused its campaign on relieving unemployment and building new leisure, health, and community facilities, and believed it would win 7 or 8 seats.  The Republican Club would not speculate on how many seats it would win, but Mickey Doherty claimed that it would take a "fairly substantial vote and surprise a lot of people".

Election results
The Irish Times reported the city as having particularly high turnout, initially estimated as between 65 and 70%.  The count was the slowest in the whole of Northern Ireland.

Below is a list of the results:

Districts summary

|- class="unsortable" align="centre"
!rowspan=2 align="left"|Ward
! % 
!Cllrs
! % 
!Cllrs
! %
!Cllrs
! %
!Cllrs
! %
!Cllrs
!rowspan=2|TotalCllrs
|- class="unsortable" align="center"
!colspan=2 bgcolor=""| SDLP
!colspan=2 bgcolor="" | Alliance
!colspan=2 bgcolor="" | Nationalist
!colspan=2 bgcolor="" | RC
!colspan=2 bgcolor="white"| Others
|-
|align="left"|Area A
|32.2
|2
|12.2
|1
|1.7
|0
|2.6
|0
|bgcolor="darkorange"|51.3
|bgcolor="darkorange"|3
|6
|-
|align="left"|Area B
|18.3
|1
|17.0
|1
|4.3
|0
|2.2
|0
|bgcolor="darkorange"|58.2
|bgcolor="darkorange"|3
|5
|-
|align="left"|Area C
|bgcolor="#99FF66"|49.3
|bgcolor="#99FF66"|3
|13.4
|0
|21.4
|1
|15.9
|1
|0.0
|0
|6
|-
|align="left"|Area D
|bgcolor="#99FF66"|40.1
|bgcolor="#99FF66"|2
|13.4
|1
|11.3
|1
|8.6
|0
|26.6
|1
|5
|-
|align="left"|Area E
|31.1
|2
|15.8
|1
|9.2
|1
|6.1
|0
|bgcolor="darkorange"|37.8
|bgcolor="darkorange"|2
|6
|-
|- class="unsortable" class="sortbottom" style="background:#C9C9C9"
|align="left"| Total
|32.4
|10
|14.5
|4
|8.4
|3
|6.2
|1
|38.5
|9
|27
|-
|}

Districts results

Area A

1973: 3 x United Loyalist, 2 x SDLP, 1 x Alliance

Area B

1973: 3 x United Loyalist, 1 x SDLP, 1 x Alliance

Data missing from stage 9

Area C

1973: 3 x SDLP, 1 x Nationalist, 1 x Republican Clubs

Area D

1973: 2 x SDLP, 1 x United Loyalist, 1 x Alliance, 1 x Nationalist

Area E

1973: 2 x United Loyalist, 2 x SDLP, 1 x Alliance, 1 x Nationalist

Aftermath 
Even though the United Loyalists won the most votes, the SDLP won the most councillors with ten being elected to the United Loyalists' nine.  The nonsectarian Alliance Party of Northern Ireland won four, the Nationalist Party won three and one was won by the Republican Clubs. The result gave parties supported by the city's Catholic community a majority on the council for the first time.  The SDLP were disappointed not to win a majority on the council.  John Hume blamed this on transfers going to other parties, noting the United Loyalist voters in the Bogside had transferred to the Alliance Party, while Republican Club voters in Londonderry E had transferred to the Nationalist Party.

The new council elected Raymond McClean of the SDLP as Mayor of Londonderry, only the second Catholic mayor in the city's history, while Jack Allen of the United Loyalists was elected as deputy mayor.

Following the election, there had been disputes within the United Loyalists. Some members of the UUP once said to the DUP's Anna Hay, who had been elected to Londonderry B and was the mother of the future Speaker of the Northern Ireland Assembly William Hay, that they had only "lent" her her seat due to the UUP being historically the stronger unionist party at the time.

References

Derry City Council elections
Londonderry
1970s in County Londonderry